"J'aime la vie" ("I Love Life") was the winning song of the Eurovision Song Contest 1986, performed for  by Sandra Kim. Belgium had finished the 1985 contest in last place, and thus achieved the rare turnaround from last to first in the space of one year. The song also marks the only time to date that Belgium has won the contest. The song was also included on Kim's album J'aime la vie in 1986. When released as a single, it topped Belgium's singles chart for seven weeks and was the country's best-selling hit of 1986, and it also reached the top 20 in Austria, the Netherlands, Portugal, and Sweden.

Lyrics
Performed in French, the song is a positive one, dealing with the pleasure to be had in life.

Music video
During Preview Week, Kim sang the song with the common theme of "things she likes" intact throughout. In the video, she does many things which she finds enjoyable, which include partaking in physical education class, hanging out with friends, listening to her Walkman, buying a big ice cream cone, and performing a choreographed dance in an exercise studio.

The video was reconstructed scene by scene some 25 years later as a commercial for the insurancy company Delta Lloyd. The new and old videos were then shown side by side.

Performance at the Eurovision Song Contest 1986
At Bergen, the song was performed thirteenth on the night, following 's Luv Bug with "You Can Count on Me" and preceding 's Ingrid Peters with "Über Die Brücke Geh'n". Its winning tally was 176 points, finishing first in a field of 20. The entry received points from every jury.

In the lyrics, Kim describes herself as being "fifteen", although she was later proven to be only thirteen at the time of her performance. She thus remains the youngest ever Eurovision winner and one of the youngest-ever performers at the contest. Her record is unlikely to be challenged, as the Contest rules were changed to specify that performers must turn at least 16 in the year that they perform.

Kim, herself of Italian descent, also recorded her winning entry in Italian (with the same title as the original French, "J'aime la vie") and English (two versions, the first "Crazy of Life", the second with the same title as the original French, "J'aime la vie").

In a 2006 online interview with 12points.be, Kim was asked if she sings "J'aime la vie" "with pleasure" at concerts and events now, to which she responded, "Not always." She then said, "It's a little girl's song, with little girl's lyrics, with a young adolescent's atmosphere. Nowadays, singing 'J'aime la vie'... do you like life every day? Me neither." She does however continue to perform the song, and in 2007 one of the performances was televised live on Norwegian TV.

"J'aime la vie" was succeeded as Belgian representative at the 1987 contest, held in Brussels, by Liliane Saint-Pierre performing "Soldiers of Love".

Track listing
7-inch single
 "J'aime la vie" – 3:00
 "Ne m'oublie pas" – 4:39

Personnel
"J'aime la vie"
 Written by R. Marino-Atria/J.F. Furnemont-A. Crisci
 Arranged by J.P. Lebens
 Produced by Marino

"On n'oublie pas"
 Written by R. Marino-Atria/J.F. Furnemont-A. Crisci-A. Bertrand
 Engineered L. Tylgat

Charts

Weekly charts

Year-end charts

Popular culture
"J'aime la vie" was covered by Pommelien Thijs as the character in Caroline Timmers in the Flemish TV series #LikeMe.

References

External links
 Official Eurovision Song Contest site, history by year, 1986.
 Detailed info and lyrics, The Diggiloo Thrush, "J'aime la vie".

1986 singles
1986 songs
Carrere Records singles
Eurovision Song Contest winning songs
Eurovision songs of 1986
Eurovision songs of Belgium
Sandra Kim songs